Operation Neuland (New Land) was the German Navy's code name for the extension of unrestricted submarine warfare into the Caribbean Sea during World War II. U-boats demonstrated range to disrupt United Kingdom petroleum supplies and United States aluminum supplies which had not been anticipated by Allied pre-war planning. Although the area remained vulnerable to submarines for several months, U-boats never again enjoyed the opportunities for success resulting from the surprise achieved by the submarines participating in this operation.

Background
The Caribbean was strategically significant because of Venezuelan oil fields in the southeast and the Panama Canal in the southwest. The Royal Dutch Shell oil refinery on Dutch-owned Curaçao, processing eleven million barrels per month, was the largest in the world; the refinery at Pointe-à-Pierre on Trinidad was the largest in the British Empire; and there was another large refinery on Dutch-owned Aruba. The British Isles required four oil tankers of petroleum daily during the early war years, and most of it came from Venezuela, through Curaçao, after Italy blocked passage through the Mediterranean Sea from the Middle East.

The Caribbean held additional strategic significance to the United States.  The southern United States Gulf of Mexico coastline, including petroleum facilities and Mississippi River trade, could be defended at two points.  The United States was well positioned to defend the Straits of Florida but was less able to prevent access from the Caribbean through the Yucatán Channel.  Bauxite was the preferred ore for aluminum, and one of the few strategic raw materials not available within the continental United States.  United States military aircraft production depended upon bauxite imported from the Guianas along shipping routes paralleling the Lesser Antilles.

United States Navy VP-51 Consolidated PBY Catalinas began neutrality patrols along the Lesser Antillies from San Juan, Puerto Rico on 13 September 1939.  The United Kingdom had established military bases on Trinidad; and British troops occupied Aruba, Curaçao and Bonaire soon after the Netherlands were captured by Nazi Germany.  The French island of Martinique was perceived as a possible base for Axis ships as British relationships with Vichy France deteriorated following the Second Armistice at Compiègne.  The September 1940 Destroyers for Bases Agreement enabled the United States to build bases in British Guiana, and on the islands of Great Exuma, Jamaica, Antigua, Saint Lucia and Trinidad.

Concept
Declaration of war on 8 December 1941 removed United States neutrality assertions which had previously protected trade shipping in the Western Atlantic. The relatively ineffective anti-submarine warfare (ASW) measures along the United States Atlantic coast observed by U-boats participating in Operation Paukenschlag encouraged utilizing the range of German Type IX submarines to explore conditions in what had previously been the southern portion of a declared Pan American neutrality zone. The first three U-boats sailed on 19 January with orders to simultaneously attack Dutch refinery facilities on 16 February. U-161 sailed on 24 January to attack Trinidad, and U-129 followed on 26 January.   sailed on 2 February to patrol the Windward Passage between Cuba and Hispaniola; and five large Italian submarines sailed from Bordeaux to patrol the Atlantic side of the Lesser Antilles. These eleven submarines would patrol independently to disperse Allied ASW resources until exhaustion of food, fuel or torpedoes required them to return to France.

Implementation

U-156
The second patrol of U-156 was under the command of Werner Hartenstein. On the evening of 15 February,U-156 surfaced after nightfall, two miles off Aruba. Hartenstein commenced his attack at 0131 on 16 February, when he fired two torpedoes at the tankers SS Pedernales and SS Oranjestad laying at anchor outside San Nicolaas. Ten minutes later, U-156 moved to within 3/4 mile of the Lago refinery and prepared to bombard it with her 10.5 cm deck gun. However, a crewman failed to remove the tampion from the muzzle, and the first shell detonated in the barrel. One gunner was killed, another was seriously injured, and the muzzle of the gun barrel was splayed open. Following the attack, U-156 sailed past Oranjestad, 14 miles to the west, and fired three torpedoes at the Shell tanker Arkansas berthed at the Eagle Pier. One struck the ship, causing minor damage, one missed its mark and disappeared in the water, and the third beached itself. A few days later, four Dutch marines were killed as they attempted to disarm the beached torpedo.
Hartenstein kept U-156 submerged north of Aruba after daybreak. At nightfall the crew buried the sailor who died when the gun exploded, and the captain received permission to sail to Martinique, where the injured crewman was put ashore. The crew used hacksaws to shorten the damaged gun barrel by 40 centimeters, and used the sawed-off gun to sink two ships encountered after all torpedoes had been expended sinking two other ships. U-156 started home on 28 February 1942.

U-67
The third patrol of U-67 was under the command of Günther Müller-Stöckheim.  In coordination with the attack on Aruba U-67 moved into Curaçao's Willemstad harbor shortly after midnight on 16 February to launch six torpedoes at three anchored tankers.  The four bow torpedoes hit, but failed to explode.  The two torpedoes from the stern tubes were effective on the third tanker.

U-502
The third patrol of U-502 was under the command of Jürgen von Rosensteil. In coordination with the attacks on Aruba and Willemstad, U-502 waited to ambush shallow draft Lake Maracaibo crude oil tankers en route to the refineries.  After three tankers were reported missing, the Chinese crews of surviving tankers refused to sail; and Associated Press broadcast a report that tanker traffic had been halted in the area.  U-502 moved north and started home via the Windward Passage after launching its last torpedoes on 23 February.

U-161
The second patrol of U-161 was under the command of Albrecht Achilles.  Achilles and his first watch officer Bender had both visited Trinidad while employed by Hamburg America Line before the war.  U-161 entered Trinidad's Gulf of Paria harbor at periscope depth during daylight through a deep, narrow passage or Boca.  An electronic submarine detection system registered its passage at 0930 on 18 February 1942, but the signal was dismissed as caused by a patrol boat.  After spending the day resting on the bottom of the harbor, U-161 surfaced after dark to torpedo two anchored ships.  U-161 then left the gulf with decks awash and running lights illuminated to resemble one of the harbor small craft; and then moved off to the northwest before returning to sink a ship outside the Boca.  After sunset on 10 March 1942 U-161 silently entered the shallow, narrow entrance of Castries harbor surfaced on electric motors to torpedo two freighters at dockside; and then raced out under fire from machine guns.  The two freighters had just arrived with supplies to construct the new US base; and the harbor previously considered immune to submarine attack was later fitted with an anti-submarine net.  U-161 started home on 11 March 1942.

Luigi Torelli
Luigi Torelli under the command of Antonio de Giacomo sank two ships.

U-129
Under the command of Nicolai Clausen U-129 spent its fourth patrol intercepting bauxite freighters southeast of Trinidad.  The unexpected sinkings caused a temporary halt to merchant ship sailings.  The Allies broadcast suggested routes for unescorted merchant ships to follow when sailings resumed.  The U-boats received the broadcast and were waiting at the suggested locations.

Leonardo da Vinci
 under the command of Luigi Longanesi-Cattani sank one Allied ship and a neutral Brazilian freighter.  There were no survivors from the Brazilian ship, and the sinking was not revealed.

U-126
U-126 patrolled the Windward Passage under the command of Ernst Bauer.

Enrico Tazzoli
The large 1,331-ton  under the command of Carlo Fecia di Cossato sank six ships.

Giuseppe Finzi
The large 1,331-ton  under the command of Ugo Giudice sank three ships.

Morosini
Marcello class submarine Morosini under the command of Athos Fraternale sank three ships.

Results
The Aruba refinery was within deck gun range of deep water. Grand Admiral Erich Raeder would have preferred shelling the refinery as the opening action of Operation Neuland.  On the basis of experience with the relative damage caused by deck guns in comparison to torpedoes, U-boat officers chose to begin by torpedoing tankers to cause large fires of spreading oil.  Results of the initial attacks on Aruba and Curaçao were diminished by weapon failures; and subsequent attempts to shell the Aruba refinery were discouraged by defensive fire from larger numbers of larger caliber coastal artillery and patrols by alerted aircraft and submarine chasers.

An important link in petroleum product transport from Venezuelan oil fields was a fleet of small tankers designed to reach the wells in shallow Lake Maracaibo and transport crude oil to the refineries.  Approximately ten percent of these tankers were destroyed on the first day of Operation Neuland.  Surviving tankers were temporarily immobilized when their Chinese crews mutinied and refused to sail without ASW escort.  Refinery output declined while the mutineers were jailed until sailings could resume.

Torpedoing ships within defended harbors was relatively unusual through the battle of the Atlantic.  U-boats more commonly deployed mines to permit a stealthy exit.  Although results were perceived as less significant, the difficulty of attacks in the Gulf of Paria and Castries by U-161 was comparable to Günther Prien's penetration of Scapa Flow.

Patrol of the Windward Passage by U-126 was well timed to exploit dispersion of ASW forces north and south.  U-126 sank some ships within sight of Guantanamo Bay Naval Base.

Neuland and Paukenschlag were opened with similar numbers of U-boats; but the effectiveness of Neuland was enhanced by coordination with Italian submarines.  The level of success by Italian submarines against a concentration of undefended ships sailing independently was seldom repeated and marked a high point of effective Axis cooperation in the battle of the Atlantic.

See also
 Bombardment of Curaçao

Sources
 Blair, Clay Hitler's U-Boat War: The Hunters 1939-1942 Random House (1996) 
 Cressman, Robert J. The Official Chronology of the U.S.Navy in World War II Naval Institute Press (2000) 
 Kafka, Roger & Pepperburg, Roy L. Warships of the World Cornell Maritime Press (1946)
 Kelshall, Gaylord T.M. The U-Boat War in the Caribbean United States Naval Institute Press (1994) 
 Morison, Samuel Eliot, History of United States Naval Operations in World War II (volume I) The Battle of the Atlantic September 1939-May 1943 Little, Brown and Company (1975)

Notes

1942 in the Caribbean
Caribbean Sea operations of World War II
U-boats
Conflicts in 1942
Military history of the Caribbean
Naval battles of World War II involving Germany
Naval battles of World War II involving Canada
Naval battles of World War II involving the Netherlands
Naval battles and operations of World War II involving the United Kingdom
Naval battles of World War II involving the United States
1942 in Aruba
1942 in Curaçao and Dependencies
1942 in Puerto Rico
1942 in Venezuela
Maritime incidents in Venezuela
February 1942 events
March 1942 events